In mathematics, a horn angle, also called a cornicular angle, is a type of curvilinear angle defined as the angle formed between a circle and a straight line tangent to it, or, more generally, the angle formed between two curves at a point where they are tangent to each other.

See also
 Angle
 History of geometry
 Non-Archimedean geometry

References

External links

David E. Joyce, "Definition 8" Euclid's Elements Book I

Angle